Ron Cameron (born 1951) is an American biblical scholar. He is currently a professor of religion at Wesleyan University. He is an editor of the SBL Seminar on Ancient Myths and Modern Theories of Christian Origins, a series which reassesses the agenda of modern scholarship on Christian origins.

Published works
 Redescribing Christian Origins Ron Cameron, Merrill P. Miller - 2004
 Redescribing Paul and the Corinthians Ron Cameron, Merrill P. Miller - 2011 
 The Other Gospels: Non-Canonical Gospel Texts Ron Cameron - 2001 - Sixteen texts constituting what remains of the non-canonical gospels from the first and second centuries. Some of these apocryphal gospels are from the Nag Hammadi library, made available only recently.
 editor of The Apocryphal Jesus and Christian Origins (Semeia 49).

References

American biblical scholars
Living people
1951 births